Laughing Gas is the title of several American short films (1907, 1914 starring Charlie Chaplin, 1915, 1920) whose plot revolves around real or would-be dentists.

1907 Film

Plot
The plot is that of a black woman going to the dentist for a toothache and being given laughing gas. On her way walking home, and in other situations, she can't stop laughing, and everyone she meets "catches" the laughter from her, including a vendor and police officers.

Cast
Edward Boulden
Mr. La Montte
Bertha Regustus ... Mandy Brown
Mr. Sullivan

1914 film

1915 film

Cast
Jimmy Aubrey ... Heinie
Walter Kendig ... Louie

1920 film
A film directed by Tom Buckingham.

References

External links

American silent short films
1907 films
1915 films
1920 films
1907 short films
1915 short films
1920 short films
Films directed by Edwin S. Porter
American black-and-white films
Silent American comedy films
Films directed by Tom Buckingham
1907 comedy films
1915 comedy films
1920 comedy films 
American comedy short films
1900s American films
1910s American films
1920s American films